M. Justin Herman (1909–1971) was an American public administrator. From 1951 to 1959 he was head of the regional office of the Housing and Home Finance Agency in San Francisco, California. From 1959 until his death in 1971, he was the Executive Director of the San Francisco Redevelopment Agency. Under his administration, large areas of the city were redeveloped; thousands of residents, many of them poor and non-white, were forced to leave their homes and businesses.

Early life and education 
Meyer Justin Herman was born on August 4, 1909 in New Bedford, Massachusetts. His father Samuel Lewis Herman owned a dry goods store, and had emigrated in 1891 from the Russian Partition (now Poland). 

Herman attended the University of Rochester and graduated (B.A. 1930) in economics; he was a member of the honor society Phi Beta Kappa. In 1934, he married Gladys Helen Heinrich.

Career
In his early career he worked at Eastman Kodak, as an executive trainee in accounting and marketing. In the 1940s, Herman lived in Arlington County, Virginia. During World War II, Herman was a member of the United States Navy. 

After the war he worked for various United States federal agencies. From 1951 to 1959, Herman worked as a San Francisco Bay Area regional administrator for the United States Housing and Home Finance Agency (HHFA).

Herman was appointed executive director of the San Francisco Redevelopment Agency by mayor George Christopher in April 1959. He was an experienced administrator with significant connections in the federal government and an extensive knowledge of urban redevelopment. He had the support of the Bay Area Council, of the Blyth-Zellerbach Committee and of the San Francisco Planning and Urban Renewal Association. He greatly expanded the San Francisco Redevelopment Agency, from about 60 employees before he took office to 462 shortly after his death.

Herman was responsible for the redevelopment, in two phases, of the Western Addition and for the transformation of Geary Street into Geary Boulevard. In the second phase of the Western Addition project, 10,000 people were displaced and more than 60 city blocks cleared by 1970. The agency also aggressively acquired land in Chinatown, the Golden Gateway, the port area, South of Market and the Tenderloin, expropriating poor people from those areas.

Herman died at the age of 62 of a heart attack on August 30, 1971 in San Francisco.

Reception

The National Association of Housing and Redevelopment Officials makes an annual M. Justin Herman Award. Justin Herman Plaza, opposite the Ferry Building in San Francisco, was named for him from 1971 until October 19, 2017.

While Herman's actions were largely supported by the elite of the city and by banks, businesses and the city government, his reputation among those he displaced from their homes was very low. Sun-Reporter journalist, Thomas C. Fleming described Herman in 1965 as the "arch-villain in the black depopulation of the city", while Reverend Hannibal Williams of the Western Addition Community Organization (WACO) said, "We didn't know who the devil was. But we knew who Justin Herman was and that was the devil for us".

In July 2017, San Francisco Supervisor Aaron Peskin introduced a resolution which would temporarily rename Justin Herman Plaza to Embarcadero Plaza until a new permanent name could be attached, citing Herman's role in displacing poor and minority residents from the Western Addition, Fillmore, Chinatown, and South of Market neighborhoods. The San Francisco Board of Supervisors passed the resolution unanimously on September 19, 2017. The new name would need to be decided by the San Francisco Recreation and Park Commission, which has jurisdiction over naming public spaces. Peskin stated the site's owner, Boston Properties, told him they would cover the cost (estimated at ) of replacing the plaque bearing Herman's name. The plaza is officially known as Embarcadero Plaza.

See also
Robert Moses
Modernist architecture
Federal Power Commission v. Tuscarora Indian Nation

References

External links 
 Video: Groundbreaking Ceremony in Fillmore District for Prince Hall Apartments (1970) KPIX News from the Bay Area Television Archive at San Francisco State University
 Video: M. Justin Herman joins Mary Rogers on a picket line (1971) KPIX-TV from the Bay Area Television Archive at San Francisco State University

1909 births
1971 deaths
People from New Bedford, Massachusetts
University of Rochester alumni
United States Navy personnel of World War II
People from San Francisco
History of San Francisco